Tabletop sports are sports that are played on a tabletop. Unlike tabletop games, tabletop sports require physical dexterity. Included are games like table football, sports table football, button football, table tennis, headis, cue sports, air hockey, and table hockey games. They are usually played indoors.

Tabletop games
Indoor sports
Games of physical skill